Emerald View Park (formerly called Grand View Scenic Byway Park) is a large municipal park in Pittsburgh, Pennsylvania. It encircles the neighborhoods of Mt. Washington, Duquesne Heights and Allentown and offers scenic views of the city that draw more than 1.5 million visitors annually.

It joins Frick, Schenley, Highland,and Riverview as the fifth in the city's network of regional parks. Until consolidated in 2006, this land was an assortment of existing smaller parks, greenways, forested hillsides, playing fields, and neglected land parcels. It is jointly managed by the city of Pittsburgh and the neighborhood's community development corporation.

History
In the aftermath of a rare tornado in 1998 that touched down in the neighborhood, the park was conceived by community activists as a way to address the damage. They called themselves "Green Is Good". They feared a post-storm "blighted" designation would spur the city to allow housing and condominium development.  Although Mount  Washington's vista points are a high-profile attraction, they argued, the true amenity was the continuous  of green, hilly, undeveloped land that rings the Mount. Eventually "Green Is Good" won the support of Mt. Washington Community Development Corporation, other local nonprofits, and the city government.

In 2003, the state designated three Pittsburgh roads—Sycamore Street, McArdle Roadway, and Grandview Avenue—as Pennsylvania Scenic Byways, inspiring the park's very long former name.

Notes

References
 Tom Barnes (2002). Project would improve Mt. Washington greenway: story from the Pittsburgh Post-Gazette. 
Diana Nelson Jones (2006). Grand View Scenic Byway Park: story from the Pittsburgh Post-Gazette. Retrieved May 12, 2007.
Diana Nelson Jones (2007). Ilyssa Manspeizer is the new park manager in Mount Washington: story from the Pittsburgh Post-Gazette. Retrieved June 11, 2007.

External links

 
 2002 Pittsburgh Post-Gazette story of the creation and early stages of the Emerald Link project which became the Grandview Scenic Byway Park 
 Background story of the development of Grand View Scenic Byway Park

Monongahela River
Ohio River
Parks in Pittsburgh
Urban forests in the United States
Urban public parks